Warang Citi is a Unicode block containing characters for Warang Citi (Varang Kshiti) script which is used by some to write the Ho language.

History
The following Unicode-related documents record the purpose and process of defining specific characters in the Warang Citi block:

References 

Unicode blocks
Ho language